Stanislav Vahala (born 26 November 1960) is a retired Czech football goalkeeper.

References

1960 births
Living people
Czech footballers
FC Baník Ostrava players
FK Hvězda Cheb players
FC DAC 1904 Dunajská Streda players
SK Slavia Prague players
FC Hradec Králové players
Czech First League players
Association football goalkeepers
Czechoslovakia under-21 international footballers
Sportspeople from Nový Jičín